Ngeruktabel is an island of the Koror state of Palau in the South Pacific.

Geography and history
Ngeruktabel is the second largest island of Palau and the largest one of the Rock Islands. Like other Rock Islands, Ngeruktabel is uninhabited 
today. However, the local oral history identifies at least five ancient villages existing in the late prehistoric times. The local population migrated 
northward to Koror and Babeldaob. Depopulation is recorded as being primarily associated with the warfare.

References

External links
 Rock Islands Southern Lagoon

Islands of Palau
Koror
Uninhabited islands of Palau